Michael Wolf (born June 1, 1967) holds the Chair of Econometrics and Applied Statistics in the Department of Economics at the University of Zurich, Switzerland. He was previously Professor at UCLA, Charles III University of Madrid, and Pompeu Fabra University.

Biography
Wolf was born in Germany, where he obtained a bachelor's degree in mathematics from the University of Augsburg. From 1991 he studied statistics at Stanford University (M.Sc. 1995, Ph.D. 1996).

Wolf is known for his work on shrinkage estimation of large-dimensional covariance matrices. While originally motivated by Markowitz portfolio selection, the linear shrinkage estimator he developed in collaboration with Olivier Ledoit has been widely adopted by other researchers in a variety of scientific fields such as
cancer research, 
chemistry,
civil engineering,
climatology, 
electrical engineering,
genetics, geology, 
neuroscience, 
psychology,
speech recognition, etc. The common feature between these applications is that the dimension of the covariance matrix is not negligible with respect to the size of the sample. In this case the usual estimator, the sample covariance matrix, is inaccurate and ill-conditioned. By contrast, the Ledoit-Wolf estimator is more accurate and guaranteed to be well-conditioned, even in the difficult case where matrix dimension exceeds sample size.

Michael Wolf also co-wrote the book on Subsampling, a resampling method inspired by the jackknife that constitutes an alternative to the bootstrap. In the field of multiple testing, he introduced new procedures to control the family-wise error rate that are more powerful than previous methods, by taking into account the dependence between test statistics. He also worked on procedures to control generalized error rates, such as the generalized family-wise error rate, the false discovery proportion and the false discovery rate.

Michael Wolf served on the editorial board of the Annals of Statistics and Statistics and Probability Letters. In 2004, he won the Distinguished Researcher award from the Generalitat of Catalonia. He was invited to give the prestigious Gumbel Lecture at the Annual Meeting of the German Statistical Society in Cologne in 2008.

Selected publications
Books

Articles on Shrinkage Estimation of Covariance Matrices

Articles on Subsampling

Articles on Multiple Testing

References

External links
Official University of Zurich webpage 
Google Scholar Citation page

1967 births
Living people
German statisticians
Econometricians
Academic staff of the University of Zurich
Stanford University School of Humanities and Sciences alumni
University of Augsburg alumni
Computational statisticians